Timothy or Tim Barnes may refer to:
 Timothy Barnes (classicist) (born 1942), British classicist
 Timothy Barnes, 4th Baron Gorell (1927–2007), British businessman
 Tim Barnes (politician) (born 1958), member of the Tennessee Senate
 Tim Barnes (American football) (born 1988), American football player
 Tim Barnes (rugby league) (born 1961), Australian rugby league player